The Beloretsk constituency (No. 5) is a Russian legislative constituency in Bashkortostan.

Geography 

The constituency is located in east-central Bashkiriya and stretches from eastern Ufa to the city of Beloretsk.

Beloretsk constituency was created in 2016 from parts of former Kirovsky, Oktyabrsky and Kumertau constituencies.

Members elected

Election results

2016

|-
! colspan=2 style="background-color:#E9E9E9;text-align:left;vertical-align:top;" |Candidate
! style="background-color:#E9E9E9;text-align:left;vertical-align:top;" |Party
! style="background-color:#E9E9E9;text-align:right;" |Votes
! style="background-color:#E9E9E9;text-align:right;" |%
|-
|style="background-color: " |
|align=left|Zugura Rakhmatullina
|align=left|United Russia
|155,315
|43.80%
|-
|style="background-color: " |
|align=left|Ivan Sukharev
|align=left|Liberal Democratic Party
|71,720
|20.22%
|-
|style="background-color: " |
|align=left|Gadzhimurad Omarov
|align=left|A Just Russia
|40,993
|11.56%
|-
|style="background-color: " |
|align=left|Khanif Akhmedyanov
|align=left|Communist Party
|33,773
|9.52%
|-
|style="background-color: " |
|align=left|Ildar Isangulov
|align=left|Yabloko
|27,449
|7.74%
|-
|style="background-color: " |
|align=left|Khasan Idiyatullin
|align=left|Communists of Russia
|10,636
|2.99%
|-
|style="background-color: " | 
|align=left|Ramil Suleymanov
|align=left|Rodina
|5,564
|1.57%
|-
|style="background-color: " |
|align=left|Murad Shafikov
|align=left|The Greens
|5,273
|1.49%
|-
| colspan="5" style="background-color:#E9E9E9;"|
|- style="font-weight:bold"
| colspan="3" style="text-align:left;" | Total
| 354,614
| 100%
|-
| colspan="5" style="background-color:#E9E9E9;"|
|- style="font-weight:bold"
| colspan="4" |Source:
|
|}

2021

|-
! colspan=2 style="background-color:#E9E9E9;text-align:left;vertical-align:top;" |Candidate
! style="background-color:#E9E9E9;text-align:left;vertical-align:top;" |Party
! style="background-color:#E9E9E9;text-align:right;" |Votes
! style="background-color:#E9E9E9;text-align:right;" |%
|-
|style="background-color: " |
|align=left|Elvira Aitkulova
|align=left|United Russia
|228,980
|59.23%
|-
|style="background-color: " |
|align=left|Albert Gazizov
|align=left|Communist Party
|48,746
|12.61%
|-
|style="background-color: " |
|align=left|Ivan Sukharev
|align=left|Liberal Democratic Party
|45,276
|11.71%
|-
|style="background-color: " |
|align=left|Aleksandr Polyakov
|align=left|Communists of Russia
|10,235
|2.65%
|-
|style="background-color: " |
|align=left|Eliana Saitova
|align=left|A Just Russia — For Truth
|9,181
|2.37%
|-
|style="background-color: " |
|align=left|Konstantin Kulikov
|align=left|New People
|7,988
|2.07%
|-
|style="background-color: " |
|align=left|Anatoly Shulayev
|align=left|Party of Pensioners
|7,682
|1.99%
|-
|style="background-color: " |
|align=left|Radmir Burangulov
|align=left|The Greens
|7,226
|1.87%
|-
|style="background-color: " | 
|align=left|Mikhail Korovin
|align=left|Rodina
|7,163
|1.85%
|-
|style="background-color: " |
|align=left|Zulfia Gaisina
|align=left|Yabloko
|5,363
|1.39%
|-
|style="background-color: " |
|align=left|Arina Fairushina
|align=left|Russian Party of Freedom and Justice
|4,485
|1.16%
|-
| colspan="5" style="background-color:#E9E9E9;"|
|- style="font-weight:bold"
| colspan="3" style="text-align:left;" | Total
| 386,580
| 100%
|-
| colspan="5" style="background-color:#E9E9E9;"|
|- style="font-weight:bold"
| colspan="4" |Source:
|
|}

References 

Russian legislative constituencies
Politics of Bashkortostan